Pei Ziye (裴子野, 471-532) was a Chinese historian of the southern Liang dynasty; he lived through the Liu Song and Southern Qi dynasties. He was the grandson of another historian, Pei Yin (裴駰), a son of the famous historian Pei Songzhi.

Childhood
Pei Ziye's mother Lady Wei died when he was born, and he was brought up by his grandmother Lady Yin. When Pei was nine (by East Asian reckoning), Lady Yin died; in his sorrow, Pei cried until he had blood in his tears.

Theory on origin of the Hephthalites
Pei Ziye is, among other things, known for making a mistaken conjecture about the origin of the Hephthalites, who just sent an embassy at the Chinese court of the Liang dynasty in 516 CE, saying that they may be descendants of the Jushi based on a false etymology. This account appears in Pei Ziye's biography in  Liangshu (Volume 30):

In effect, many foreign embassies visited the Chinese court at that time, and particularly three Hephthalite (Hua) ambassadors are known, who visited in 516–520 CE, and are described in the Portraits of Periodical Offering.

The Emperor then ordered Pei Ziye to write an illustrated account of foreign embassies, Fangguoshitu (方國使圖), which may have been the basis for the original Portraits of Periodical Offering of Liang, and the Hephthalites account of the Liangshu (Volume 54), and this account again mentioned Pei Ziye's conjectural etymology.

Summary of Song
Another of Pei Ziye's achievements was his distillation of Shen Yue's Book of Song (《宋书》) into a more succinct version, Summary of Song (《宋略》); after reading Summary of Song, Shen was recorded to have said, "This is a standard which I cannot reach."

Ancestors
Pei Ziye is a member of the Pei clan of Hedong (河东裴氏). His father is Pei Zhaoming (裴昭明; 460 - 502), son of Pei Yin, son of Pei Songzhi. Pei Songzhi's father is Pei Gui (裴圭), son of Pei Mei (裴昧). Pei Mei's great-grandfather is Pei Kang (裴康). Pei Kang, along with his older brother Pei Li (裴黎), and younger brothers Pei Kai (裴楷) and Pei Chuo (裴绰) were famous during their time and were known as the "4 Peis".

References

6th-century Chinese historians
Pei clan of Hedong